The 1945 New Year Honours were appointments by many of the Commonwealth realms of King George VI to various orders and honours to reward and highlight good works by citizens of those countries. They were announced on 1 January 1945 for the British Empire, Canada, and the Union of South Africa to celebrate the past year and mark the beginning of 1945.

The recipients of honours are displayed here as they were styled before their new honour, and arranged by honour, with classes (Knight, Knight Grand Cross, etc.) and then divisions (Military, Civil, etc.) as appropriate.

British Empire

Earl
 The Right Honourable David Lloyd George,

Viscount
 The Right Honourable Wyndham Raymond, Baron Portal,  – Minister of Works, 1942–1944.

Baron
 Sir Arthur Grey Hazlerigg,  – His Majesty's Lieutenant of the County of Leicester. For public services.

Baronet
 Major Thomas Lionel Dugdale,  – Member of Parliament for the Richmond division of Yorkshire since May 1929. Chairman of the Conservative Party Organization, March 1942 to October 1944. For political and public services.
 Sir Charles Bruce-Gardner – lately Controller of Labour Allocation and Supply, Ministry of Aircraft Production. Chief Executive for Reconversion, Board of Trade.
 Sir Alfred Edward Webb-Johnson,  – President of the Royal College of Surgeons.

Privy Counsellors
 Miss Florence Horsbrugh, Member of Parliament for Dundee since 1931. Parliamentary Secretary, Ministry of Health, since 1939.
 Miss Ellen Cicely Wilkinson, Member of Parliament for Middlesbrough East 1929–1931, and for Jarrow since 1935. Parliamentary Secretary, Ministry of Home Security, since 1940.

Knight Bachelor
 Leslie Patrick Abercrombie,  – Professor of Town Planning in the University of London.
 Edward Battersby Bailey,  – Director of the Geological Survey of Great Britain, Department of Scientific and Industrial Research.
 Frederick William Bain,  – Chairman, Chemical Control Board, Ministry of Supply.
 Captain Ernest Arthur Bridges – lately Commodore Master, Royal Mail Line Fleet, Royal Mail Lines Ltd.
 Peter Boswell Brown,  – Chairman and Managing Director, Hadfields Ltd.
 James Chadwick,  – Professor of Physics in the University of Liverpool. For services to the Department of Scientific and Industrial Research.
 Lawrence Andrew Common,  – Director, Ship Management Division, Ministry of War Transport.
 Philip D'Ambrumenil – Deputy Chairman, War Risks Insurance Office. 
 Charles Frederick Deslandes – Chief Inspector, Board of Customs and Excise.
 Roy Hardy Dobson,  – Managing Director, A.V. Roe and Company Ltd.
 Commander Aylmer Newton George Firebrace,  – Chief of the Fire Staff and Inspector-in-Chief of the Fire Services, Home Office.
 Arthur Percy Morris Fleming,  – Director, Metropolitan Vickers Electrical Company, Manchester. For services to education.
 Claude Howard Stanley Frankau,  – Director, Emergency Medical Services, London and Home Counties.
 Edward Hardy – Chairman of Kent County Council.
 Lieutenant-Colonel Arthur Pelham Heneage,  – Member of Parliament for Louth since 1924. For political and public services.
 Roger Gaskell Hetherington,  – Adviser on Water and Director of Water Surveys, Ministry of Health.
 William Percival Hildred,  – Director-General of Civil Aviation, Air Ministry.
 Mark Hodgson,  – General Secretary, United Society of Boilermakers and Iron and Steel Shipbuilders.
 Joseph Stanley Holmes –  Member of Parliament for North-East Derbyshire, 1918–1922, and for Harwich since November 1935. For political and public services.
 Alfred Bakewell Howitt,  – Member of Parliament for Reading since October 1931. For political and public services.
 Robert Dixon Kingham,  – Secretary, National Savings Committee.
 Robert Fisher Lancaster, Secretary and Executive Officer of the Co-operative Wholesale Society Ltd.
 Allan Campbell Macdiarmid – Chairman and Managing Director, Stewarts & Lloyds, Ltd.
 Geoffrey Le Mesurier Mander,  – Member of Parliament for Wolverhampton East since May 1929. For political and public services. 
 Ellis Hovell Minns, LittD  – Emeritus Professor of Archaeology and President of Pembroke College, University of Cambridge.
 Arthur Evan Morgan – General Manager and Director, The London Assurance.
 John Morison – Director General of Finance, Ministry of Supply.
 James Frederick Rees,  – Principal of University College of South Wales and Monmouthshire, Cardiff. Vice-Chancellor of the University of Wales.
 Lieutenant-Colonel Norman Gibb Scorgie,  – Controller, H.M. Stationery Office.
 Arthur Frederick Sidgreaves,  – Managing Director, Rolls-Royce Ltd.
 Frederick James Simmons,  – Mayor of Londonderry.
 Alderman Bracewell Smith,  – Sheriff of the City of London.
 David Wadsworth Smith,  – Director, Halifax Building Society.
 William Samuel Stephenson,  – employed in a Department of the Foreign Office.
 Reginald Edward Stradling,  – Chief Adviser, Research and Experiments Department; Ministry of Home Security.
 Herbert Alker Tripp,  – Assistant Commissioner, Metropolitan Police.
 Lieutenant-Colonel Gilbert John Acland Troyte,  – Member of Parliament for Tiverton since 1924. For political and public services.
 Alderman William Walker,  – For services to Municipal Electricity Supply.
 Angus Watson,  – Divisional Food Officer, Northern Division, Ministry of Food.
 Lionel Ernest Howard Whitby,  – (Brigadier, Territorial Army, Reserve of Officers), lately Bacteriologist at the Middlesex Hospital. For services in the development of the sulphonamide group of drugs.
 Professor Edmund Taylor Whittaker,  – Professor of Mathematics, University of Edinburgh. Lately President of the Royal Society of Edinburgh.

Dominions
 Digby Vere Burnett – Resident Director and General Manager of the London and Rhodesia Mining and Land Company, Limited, and Chairman of the Cold Storage Commission, Southern Rhodesia.
 Colonel Arthur Murray Cudmore,  – President of the Medical Board of the State of South Australia. For public services.
 Thomas Sydney Nettlefold,  – Lord Mayor of the City of Melbourne, State of Victoria.

India
 The Honourable Mr. Justice Harsidhbhai Vajubhai Divatia – Puisne Judge of the High Court of Judicature at Bombay.
 The Honourable Mr. Justice James Joseph Whittlesea Allsop – Indian Civil Service, Puisne Judge of the High Court of Judicature at Allahabad, United Provinces.
 The Honourable Mr. Justice Syed Najim Ali – Puisne Judge of the High Court of Judicature at Fort William in Bengal.
 Robert William Targett,  – Director-General, Supply and Disposals, Department of Supply, Government of India.
 Eric Thomas Coates,  – Indian Civil Service, Financial Adviser, Military Finance, Government of India.
 Bomanji Jamshedji Wadia – Barrister-at-Law, Vice-Chancellor, University of Bombay.
 Diwan Bahadur Arcot Lakshmanaswami Mudaliyar,  – Vice-Chancellor, University of Madras.
 Charles William Blyth Normand,  – Officer on Special Duty, India Meteorological Department, and lately Director-General of Observatories, Government of India.
 Claude Cavendish Inglis,  – Indian Service of Engineers (retired), Director, Indian Waterways Experiment Station, Poona.
 Khan Bahadur Malik Muhammad Amin Khan,  – Landlord, Shamsabad, Attock District, Punjab.
 James McHame Doak – Managing Director and Partner, Messrs. A. & F. Harvey, Madura, Madras.
 Jehangir Jivaji Ghandy,  – Agent, Tata Iron & Steel Company, Limited.
 Shrinivas Prasonna Rajagopalachari – Home Minister and Vice-President of the Executive Council of Gwalior State.

Colonies, Protectorates, etc.
 Henry William Butler Blackall – Colonial Legal Service, Chief Justice, Trinidad.
 Lieutenant-Colonel Stewart Gore-Browne,  – For public services in Northern Rhodesia.
 Walter Harrangin – Colonial Legal Service, Chief Justice of the Gold Coast.
 Colonel Percy John Parsons,  – For public services in Ceylon.

Knight of the Most Ancient and Most Noble Order of the Thistle (KT)
 Admiral of the Fleet Sir Andrew Browne Cunningham,  – First Sea Lord and Chief of the Naval Staff.

The Most Honourable Order of the Bath

Knight Grand Cross of the Order of the Bath (GCB)
Military Division
 General Sir Frederick Alfred Pile,  – (3052), late Royal Tank Corps.
 General Sir Claude John Eyre Auchinleck,  – (115611), Indian Army, Aide-de-Camp General to The King.

Knights Commander of the Order of the Bath (KCB)
Military Division
 Vice-Admiral Irvine Gordon Glennie, 
 Vice-Admiral Arthur Francis Eric Palliser, 
 Vice-Admiral Frederick Hew George Dalrymple-Hamilton, 
 Rear-Admiral Cloudesley Varyl Robinson,  (Retired).
 Lieutenant-General Sir Henry Royds Pownall,  – (3553), Colonel Commandant, Royal Artillery.
 General Henry Finnis,  – Colonel 312th Frontier Force Regiment, Indian Army.

Civil Division
 Frederick Arthur Whitaker, 
 Colonel John Bickerton McKaig,  – Chairman, Territorial Army and Air Force Association of the County of Lancaster (West).

Companion of the Order of the Bath (CB)
Military Division
 Rear-Admiral Cedric Swinton Holland.
 Rear-Admiral Charles Eric Morgan, 
 Rear-Admiral Victor Alexander Charles Crutchley, .
 Rear-Admiral Oliver Bevir
 Rear-Admiral Douglas Blake Fisher, .
 Rear-Admiral Arthur William La Touche Bisset, .
 Rear-Admiral James Stuart Maclaren Ritchie (Retired).
 Rear-Admiral Reginald Burnard Darke,  (Retired).
 Rear-Admiral Charles Frederick Harris (Retired).
 Engineer Rear-Admiral Albert Kingsley Dibley.
 Major-General Hamilton Wilkie Simpson,  – Royal Marines.
 Temporary Lieutenant (Acting Temporary Captain (Special Branch)) the Right Honourable John Charles Walsham, Baron Reith, 
 Colonel (temporary Major-General) Alexander Vass Anderson,  – (17247), late Royal Engineers.
 Colonel (temporary Major-General) Gerald Brunskill,  – (18511), late The Royal Ulster Rifles.
 Colonel (temporary Major-General) Alexander Maurice Cameron,  – (9292), late Royal Engineers.
 Major-General John Scott Crawford,  – (11221), late Royal Army Ordnance Corps.
 Lieutenant-Colonel (temporary Colonel) John Henry Bevan,  – (50751). Reserve of Officers, General List, Territorial Army.
 Colonel (temporary Major-General) David Robertson Duguid,  – (34486), late -Royal Electrical and Mechanical Engineers.
 Colonel (temporary Brigadier) Charles Esmond de Wolff,  – (15057), late Royal Army Ordnance Corps.
 Colonel (temporary Major-General) Donald Rutherford Dacre Fisher,  – (927), late Royal Artillery.
 Colonel (honorary Major-General) Ian Cameron Grant,  – (19374), late The Queen's Own Cameron Highlanders.
 Colonel (temporary Major-General) Reginald Kingscote Hewer,  – (9276), late Royal Armoured Corps.
 Colonel (temporary Major-General) John Charles Francis Holland,  – (18665), late Royal Engineers.
 Colonel (temporary Major-General) Harold Reginald Kerr,  – (17076), late Royal Army Service Corps.
 Colonel (temporary Major-General) Robert Edward Laycock,  – (37258), Royal Horse Guards.
 Major-General Herbert Lumsden,  – (11523), late Royal Armoured Corps.
 Colonel (temporary Major-General) William Godwin Michelmore,  – (25379), Royal Corps of Signals, Territorial Army, Aide-de-Camp to The King.
 Colonel (temporary Brigadier) Arthur Penrice Sayer,  – (4740), retired pay, Reserve of Officers, late Royal Engineers.
 Colonel (temporary Brigadier) William Ross Stewart,  – Indian Medical Service.
 Major-General David Turnbull Richardson,  – (3014), Royal Army Medical Corps.
 Colonel (honorary Major-General) Guy St. George Robinson,  – (1909), retired pay, Colonel, The Northamptonshire Regiment.
 Colonel (temporary Major-General) Gilbert France Watson,  – (16422), late The Royal Welch Fusiliers.
 Lieutenant-Colonel (temporary Colonel) Alexander Craven Vicary,  – (4144), Reserve of Officers, The Gloucestershire Regiment.
 Colonel (honorary Major-General) John Edward Talbot Younger (15078), retired pay, late Royal Artillery.
 Major-General Cyril Maton Periam Durnford,  – Indian Army.
 Major-General Robert Harley Wordsworth,  – Indian Army.
 Colonel (temporary Major-General) Ernest Wood,  – Indian Army.
 Colonel (temporary Major-General) Francis Robert Roy Bucher,  – Indian Army.
 Captain (Commodore Second Class) Sir Atwell Henry Lake,  – Royal Navy (Retired).
 Colonel Frescheville Hubert Ballantine-Dykes,  – President, Territorial Army Association of the County of Cumberland.
 Brevet Colonel Charles Joseph Edmondstoune-Cranstoun,  – Chairman, Territorial Army Association of the County of Lanark.
 Lieutenant-Colonel (Honorary Colonel) Ernest Clive Atkins,  – Chairman, Territorial Army Association of the County of Leicester.

Civil Division
 George Arthur Bassett

References

New Year Honours
1945 in New Zealand
New Zealand awards
1945 awards